Thread is an IPv6-based, low-power mesh networking technology for Internet of things (IoT) products. The Thread protocol specification is available at no cost; however, this requires agreement and continued adherence to an End-User License Agreement (EULA), which states that "Membership in Thread Group is necessary to implement, practice, and ship Thread technology and Thread Group specifications."

Thread uses 6LoWPAN, which, in turn, uses the IEEE 802.15.4 wireless protocol with mesh communication (on the 2.4 GHz spectrum), as does Zigbee and other systems.  However, Thread is IP-addressable, with cloud access and AES encryption. A BSD-licensed open-source implementation of Thread, called "OpenThread", is available from and managed by Google.

In 2019, the Connected Home over IP project (later renamed "Matter"), led by Zigbee Alliance (now Connectivity Standards Alliance), Google, Amazon, and Apple, announced a broad collaboration to create a royalty-free standard and open-source code base to promote interoperability in home connectivity, leveraging Thread, Wi-Fi, and Bluetooth Low Energy. In 2021, Thread was awarded the Smart Home Innovation of the Year from The Ambient's Smart Home Awards.

Thread Group 
In July 2014, the Thread Group alliance was formed as an industry group to develop, maintain and drive adoption of Thread as an industry networking standard for IoT applications. Thread Group provides certification for components and products to ensure adherence to the spec. Initial members were ARM Holdings, Big Ass Solutions, NXP Semiconductors/Freescale, Google-subsidiary Nest Labs, OSRAM, Samsung, Silicon Labs, Somfy, Tyco International, Qualcomm, and the Yale lock company. In August 2018 Apple Inc. joined the group and released its first Thread product, the HomePod Mini, in late 2020.

Selling points and key features 
Thread is a low-power and low-latency wireless mesh networking protocol built using open and proven standards. It uses 6LoWPAN, which is based on the use of a connecting router, called an edge router. Thread calls their edge routers Border Routers. Thread solves the complexities of the IoT, addresses challenges such as interoperability, range, security, energy, and reliability. Thread networks don't have a single point of failure and include the ability to self-heal.

Thread is based on existing technologies in all its layers: from routing, packeting, and security to its wireless radio technology. Similar to Wi-Fi, with its broad range of devices, Thread is an open standard that is not tied to a specific manufacturer, which minimizes the risk of incompatibilities.

Thread’s IP foundation is application agnostic, offering product manufacturers the flexibility to choose one (or multiple) app layers to connect devices across multiple networks. Developers can bring their apps, devices, systems, and services to market faster because they’re using the same set of tools available for the Internet.

IoT protocols landscape 
Other Internet of things (IoT) protocols include Bluetooth Low Energy (including Bluetooth Mesh), Zigbee, Z-Wave, Wi-Fi HaLow, Bluetooth 5, Wirepas, MiraOS and VEmesh. Thread is complementary to many of these protocols and addresses use cases with low data rate, low-power consumption, reliability and extended range requirements.

See also
 Home automation
 Matter (standard)
 Wi-Fi Direct
 Wi-Fi EasyMesh
 DASH7
 KNX (standard)
 LonWorks (standard)
 BACnet (standard)

References

External links
  – official site
 OpenThread
 

Home automation
Building automation
Personal area networks
Mesh networking
IEEE 802
IPv6
Computer-related introductions in 2014